"My Song 5" is the sixth and final single from American pop rock band Haim's debut studio album, Days Are Gone (2013). A re-recorded version of the song, featuring rapper A$AP Ferg, was released as a single on August 15, 2014. A music video for the song was released four days later. On October 3, 2014, Haim posted a cover version by the Australian rock band Movement on their SoundCloud account to celebrate the one-year anniversary of the release of Days Are Gone.

Release
"My Song 5" was released on October 6, 2014 on a 10" picture disc vinyl.

Music video
The music video for "My Song 5" was released on August 19, 2014. The video is set on a fictional talk show called Dallas Murphy (a parody of Jerry Springer and the original Ricki Lake show), featuring Haim and several other people playing roles. The show is hosted by Vanessa Bayer, and includes cameos from various other celebrities—Ezra Koenig from Vampire Weekend, Kesha, Big Sean, Grimes, A$AP Ferg, and Ariel Rechtshaid.

In popular culture
The song was featured in the teaser trailers for the second season of the MTV drama Finding Carter.

The U2 song "Lights of Home" borrows the main riff of "My Song 5" with songwriting credited to U2 and HAIM.

Charts

References

2014 singles
2014 songs
Haim (band) songs
ASAP Ferg songs
Songs written by Ariel Rechtshaid
Polydor Records singles
Song recordings produced by Ariel Rechtshaid
Songs written by Danielle Haim
Songs written by Este Haim
Songs written by Alana Haim